The striped writhing skink (Riopa lineolata) is a species of skink found in Myanmar and Bangladesh.

References

Riopa
Reptiles described in 1870
Taxa named by Ferdinand Stoliczka
Taxobox binomials not recognized by IUCN